The Motor Neurone Disease Association (MND Association) focuses on improving access to care, research and campaigning for those people living with or affected by motor neurone disease (MND) in England, Wales and Northern Ireland.  MND is also known as amyotrophic lateral sclerosis (ALS) or, in the United States,  Lou Gehrig's disease.

The Association's chief executive is Tanya Curry and its president is neuroscientist Sir Colin Blakemore. The Royal Patron of the association is The Princess Royal.

The patrons of the Association are former English cricketer and current ICC official Chris Broad; entrepreneur and philanthropist Joel Cadbury, actor Benedict Cumberbatch CBE; palliative medicine consultant and parliamentarian Baroness Finlay of Llandaff; neuroscientist, broadcaster, author and parliamentarian Baroness Greenfield CBE; TV presenter Charlotte Hawkins; entrepreneur and philanthropist Jamie Niven; former land-speed record holder and entrepreneur Richard Noble; OBE actor Eddie Redmayne and OBE and TV/radio presenter Jeremy Vine.

The Association had previously been supported by the neurologist and four-minute-mile record breaker Sir Roger Bannister and cosmologist and theoretical physicist Professor Stephen Hawking CH CBE (who had lived with MND for many years) until their deaths in March 2018.

The ambassadors of the MND Association are actor Joss Ackland OBE; actress Gina Bellman; actor Taron Egerton; comedian and TV presenter Olivia Lee and TV presenter Natalie Pinkham.

The association is the only national charity in England, Wales and Northern Ireland that funds and promotes global research into the disease and provides support for people affected by Motor Neurone Disease. It is a membership organisation with over 9,000 members forming a national and local network that provides information and support alongside fighting for improved services. It has over 1,190 volunteers in England, Wales and Northern Ireland and around 180 paid staff, whose specialist skills and knowledge are dedicated to improving the lives of people affected by MND.

Activities

Research 
The Motor Neurone Disease Association funds and promotes research to understand what causes MND, how to diagnose it and, most importantly, how to effectively treat it so that it no longer devastates lives. It does this by:
 Funding research
 Coordinating research through conferences and symposia

The MND Association organises the International Symposium on ALS/MND, an annual event which brings together leading international researchers and health and social care professionals to present and debate innovations in their fields.

The MND Association funds research that includes animal testing.

Care and information 
 Provide information to patients and carers
 Provide care through a network of branches and regional care advisers

Fundraising 
 Fundraising and income generating activities
 The association has 89 volunteer branches and groups across England, Wales and Northern Ireland, that assist with regional fundraising activities
 The association benefits from legacies and also tribute funds, which are  left in the memory of people affected by the disease.

Awareness and campaigns 
The association has a campaigns network that helps shape a better future for people with neurological conditions such as MND. It does this by:
 Lobbying government
 Raising awareness of the condition and encouraging adoption of best practice such as the MND Charter and NICE guidelines for MND.
 Undertaking awareness activities across the year using media and PR opportunities. In 2019, the Association's 40th year this included an art exhibition at the OXO gallery.
 Sharing information, informal advice and expertise via their podcast, MND Matters (launched in March 2021).

References

1979 establishments in the United Kingdom
Health charities in the United Kingdom
Motor neuron diseases
Organisations based in Northamptonshire
Science and technology in Northamptonshire
Scientific organizations established in 1979
Amyotrophic lateral sclerosis